The T6 (Sirkeci - Kazlıçeşme) or Sirkeci - Kazlıçeşme Rail Line is a tram line, rail line or light rail line that will operate as a shuttle between the Sirkeci Terminal and Kazlıçeşme Station.

The T6 line will use 8km of track previously used by the Istanbul Sirkeci-Pythio Railway and Istanbul suburban in August 12, 2013 as part of construction of the Marmaray. It will run on refurbished tracks through Sirkeci and Kazlıçeşme. It is expected to start service in the first quarter of 2023.

As the line is defined as a rail line by the Ministry of Transport and Infrastructure, but defined as a light rail or tram system by the Istanbul Metropolitan Municipality (IMM), it is not clear what it name the line will carry.

Stations

References

External links 

Istanbul Metro